Sir Reginald Hanson, 1st Baronet, JP, DL, FSA (31 May 1840 – 18 April 1905) was Lord Mayor of London and a British Conservative Party politician.

The son of Samuel and Mary Hanson (née Choppin), Reginald was educated at Tonbridge School, Rugby School and Trinity College, Cambridge (MA, LLD).  The then headmaster of Rugby School Dr Frederick Temple (later Archbishop of Canterbury) said of Hanson on his departure, "I have a most sincere and warm regard for him.  The manly desire he shows to get rid of his faults, and to do his duty, will always deserve the respect of all who know him.  There are a few from who I part with so much regret at my own loss".  Indeed, this sense of duty was upheld and he held numerous positions of public office.

Following graduation, the young Reginald joined the Commercial Union Assurance Company (now part of Aviva plc) which was previously co-founded by his father Samuel.  Within a year he was appointed to the Board of directors where he remained until 1882.  By this time, he had already joined the family wholesale grocery business, Samuel Hanson & Son Limited.

He held a number of civic posts notably as an Alderman of Billingsgate (London) from 1880 and Sheriff of London and Middlesex, 1881–82. From 1882 to 1885 Hanson was a member of the London School Board. In 1886, he was elected Lord Mayor of London, during which time Queen Victoria celebrated her Jubilee year.  In 1887, Sir Reginald entertained Her Majesty at the Mansion House where he was created a Baronet by her, having previously been knighted.  Guests that day included the explorer Henry Morton Stanley and Judge Thomas Hughes author of Tom Brown's Schooldays.

Conservative Member of Parliament for the City of London from 1891 to 1900, Hanson was also appointed Honorary Colonel of the 4th (Royal London Militia) Battalion, Royal Fusiliers (later 6th Battalion) on 21 October 1882.

He died in 1905 and is buried on the west side of Highgate Cemetery, leaving behind two sons, Gerald (Sir Gerald Stanhope Hanson, 2nd Baronet), Francis (Sir Francis Stanhope Hanson - Knight Bachelor) and two daughters, Violet and Maud.

References

External links 
 

|-

1840 births
1905 deaths
Burials at Highgate Cemetery
People educated at Tonbridge School
People educated at Rugby School
Alumni of Trinity College, Cambridge
Sheriffs of the City of London
19th-century lord mayors of London
19th-century English politicians
20th-century English politicians
Conservative Party (UK) MPs for English constituencies
Members of Parliament of the United Kingdom for the City of London
Baronets in the Baronetage of the United Kingdom
Knights Bachelor
Members of London County Council
UK MPs 1886–1892
UK MPs 1892–1895
UK MPs 1895–1900
Members of the London School Board